Akça is an island off Izmir in Turkey.

Akça may also refer to:

Places
Akça, Dinar, village in Afyonkarahisar Province, Turkey
Akça, Batman, village in Baman Province, Turkey

People with the surname
 Murat Akça (born 1992), Turkish footballer

Turkish-language surnames